Las Danzarinas are a group of fountains installed between Plaza Tapatía and Hospicio Cabañas in Guadalajara, in the Mexican state of Jalisco. Also known as "Del Espejo" and "Fuente Danzarina" (English: "Dancing Fountain"), then fountain is a replica of one at Taj Mahal.

References

External links

 

Fountains in Mexico